Unisa Bangura (born 23 July 1987 in Freetown, Sierra Leone) is a Sierra Leonean footballer.

Career 
Unisa began his European career with Klubi-04 played here in the Ykkönen 2005, 11 games and joined than to HJK, later than in January 2007 moved to Atlantis FC.

Bangura left Europe and signed a loan contract by East End Lions, in January 2008 and turned in April 2010 back to his club Atlantis FC.

International career 
Unisa was Sierra Leone second-choice goalkeeper behind Patrick Bantamoi at the 2003 FIFA U-17 World Championship in Finland.

Sources

1987 births
Living people
Sierra Leonean footballers
Association football goalkeepers
Expatriate footballers in Finland
Atlantis FC players
Klubi 04 players
Sportspeople from Freetown